Audna or Audnedalselva is a river in Agder county, Norway. The river runs through two lakes: Øvre Øydnavatnet and Ytre Øydnavatnet.
 
The river is regulated for hydroelectric power with a total of eight power plants along the river and its tributaries.

See also
List of rivers in Norway

References

Lyngdal
Lindesnes
Rivers of Agder
Rivers of Norway